Anas El Asbahi (born 15 October 1993) is a Moroccan professional footballer who plays as a midfielder for the Swedish club Jönköpings Södra IF.

International career
In January 2014, coach Hassan Benabicha, invited him to be a part of the Morocca squad for the 2014 African Nations Championship. He helped the team to top group B after drawing with Burkina Faso and Zimbabwe and defeating Uganda. The team was eliminated from the competition at the quarter final zone after losing to Nigeria.

Honours

International
Morocco
Islamic Solidarity Games: 2013

References

External links
 

Living people
Moroccan footballers
Morocco A' international footballers
2014 African Nations Championship players
1993 births
Wydad AC players
Place of birth missing (living people)
Association football midfielders
Morocco international footballers
Moroccan expatriate sportspeople in Sweden
Ittihad Tanger players
Raja CA players
Moroccan expatriate footballers
Expatriate footballers in Sweden
Jönköpings Södra IF players